The rectus capitis lateralis, a short, flat muscle, arises from the upper surface of the transverse process of the atlas, and is inserted into the under surface of the jugular process of the occipital bone.

Additional images

See also
 Atlanto-occipital joint
 Rectus capitis posterior major muscle
 Rectus capitis posterior minor muscle
 Rectus capitis anterior muscle

References

External links

 PTCentral

Muscles of the head and neck